Richard Soto (born 11 April 1968) is a Puerto Rican basketball player. He competed in the men's tournament at the 1992 Summer Olympics and the 1996 Summer Olympics.

References

1968 births
Living people
Puerto Rican men's basketball players
Olympic basketball players of Puerto Rico
Basketball players at the 1992 Summer Olympics
Basketball players at the 1996 Summer Olympics
Basketball players from New York City